The Rinspeed Veleno was a heavily modified Dodge Viper built by Rinspeed, that debuted in 1993 at the Geneva Motor Show.

On the exterior, the Veleno features a viper green paint job, 3 piece OZ Racing wheels fitted with Pirelli PZero tires, new front lip, modified rear roll protection with an integrated spoiler, windshield frame mounted rear view mirrors, and integrated rear lower lights. On the interior, the Veleno features Vinerus upholstery in place of the original leather, green painted instrument panel and center console, integrated Alpine CD changer and a Nokia 121 cellular phone.

External links
Official website of Rinspeed
Photos at Rinspeed's website

References 

Rinspeed vehicles